The 1982 Daytona 500, the 24th running of the event, was the first race of the 1982 NASCAR Winston Cup season. It was the first time that the Daytona 500 was the first race of the season.

Bobby Allison would take the win in the #88 Gatorade-sponsored Buick Regal. Allison holds the distinction of leading the most laps in consecutive Daytona 500s in 1981 and 1982, and then win the next year. A live audience of 120,000 patrons was there for the 194-minute race in which five cautions would slow the field for 34 laps; there were a total of 31 lead changes over the course of the 200 laps. Allison's margin of victory over Cale Yarborough was 23 seconds, more than half a lap.

No Chevrolet vehicles were in this race; the last time this happened was at the 1971 Space City 300 at Meyer Speedway in Texas.

This event marked the first Daytona 500 starts for Joe Ruttman, Ron Bouchard, Jim Sauter, Rick Wilson, Tom Sneva, Mark Martin, Delma Cowart, Rusty Wallace, and Lake Speed, the only Daytona 500 start for Lowell Cowell, and the last Daytona 500 starts for Roy Smith, Gary Balough, Tighe Scott, Stan Barrett, Bobby Wawak, Donnie Allison, Billie Harvey, and Joe Millikan.

Bumpergate 
Allison's win caused controversy when his rear bumper fell off during the race. Allison's car was apparently tapped from behind by Cale Yarborough as they raced through turns three and four early in the race. After contact, Allison's bumper peeled off and flew high into the air before landing back in traffic. Several cars either ran over the bumper or collided while trying to avoid it, causing a huge crash that brought out the race's first caution.

After the bumper was off Allison's car, it was consistently faster than the competition allowing him to pull away to a significant lead despite other drivers working together in the draft.

Yarborough's crew chief, Tim Brewer, later intimated that Allison's team had intended for the bumper to come off because they knew it would offer a major aerodynamic advantage, either using hollow bolts or very thin wire to attach it superficially to the car. Allison and his crew chief Gary Nelson denied that and continue to deny it to this day.

Results

Consolation race
Fourteen cars competed in a consolation race for non-qualifiers. Slick Johnson started from the pole in the event; he finished second, with Tim Richmond winning the 30-lap race. Ronnie Thomas, Bill Meazel and James Hylton rounded out the top five.

References

Daytona 500
Daytona 500
Daytona 500
NASCAR races at Daytona International Speedway
NASCAR controversies